Banyaran-e Amir Haqmorad (also Romanized as Bānyārān-e Amīr Ḩaqmorād; also known as Bānyārān-e Seyyed Ḩasan and Bānyārān Morād) is a village in Gurani Rural District, Gahvareh District, Dalahu County, Kermanshah Province, Iran. At the 2006 census, its population was 111, in 32 families.

References 

Populated places in Dalahu County